Christopher Walters Stockdale (1665–1713) was an English politician and landowner in Yorkshire who served as Member of Parliament for Knaresborough from 1693 until his death in 1713.

Life 
He was born Christopher Walters in 1665, the second son of Robert Walters of Cundall Manor (now an independent boarding school). His uncle was William Stockdale, a distinguished Whig parliamentarian who had held his Knaresborough seat for 33 years without interruption. As a condition of inheriting his uncle's substantial estate and political interests he changed his surname to Stockdale by royal license in 1693. This estate included Bilton Hall near Harrogate. In the same year he was elected as Member of Parliament for Knaresborough.

Christopher Stockdale married Elizabeth, daughter of Sir Thomas Liddell, 2nd Baronet of Ravensworth Castle. They had one son named William Stockdale.

References 

English MPs 1690–1695
English MPs 1695–1698
English MPs 1698–1700
English MPs 1701–1702
English MPs 1702–1705
English MPs 1705–1707
British MPs 1707–1708
British MPs 1708–1710
British MPs 1710–1713
People from Knaresborough
1665 births
1713 deaths